Pusillimonas ginsengisoli is a Gram-negative, oxidase- and catalase-positive, aerobic, non-spore-forming, short rod-shaped, motile bacterium of the genus Pusillimonas, isolated from the soil of a ginseng field in South Korea. Colonies of P. ginsengisoli are pale yellow in color.

References

External links
Type strain of Pusillimonas ginsengisoli at BacDive -  the Bacterial Diversity Metadatabase

Burkholderiales
Bacteria described in 2010